Jacques Malaterre is a French filmmaker and film director, born in Avignon, Vaucluse.

Teacher for children with disabilities, and host of radio stations before 1989, he made documentaries and the docufiction aired on television. Among the latter, A Species Odyssey, Homo sapiens and The Rise of Man, dedicated to prehistory and human evolution with scientist Yves Coppens as a consultant, had a wide audience with the general public.

On 29 September 2010, he released the film Ao: The Last Hunter, an adaptation of the novel by Marc Klapczynski, Ao l'homme ancien.

Filmography

External links 
 
 Official site of the film AO, le dernier Néandertal by Jacques Malaterre

Living people
People from Avignon
French film directors
French documentary filmmakers
Year of birth missing (living people)